The Temple of Spes was an sanctuary in Ancient Rome dedicated to the goddess Spes.  The temple was situated on the Quirinal Hill by the Vicus Longus alongside the temples of Febris and Fortuna Euelpis. If still in use by the 4th-century, it would have been closed during the persecution of pagans in the late Roman Empire.

See also
List of Ancient Roman temples

References

Roman temples by deity
Temples on the Quirinal